Galgotias College, officially the Galgotias Campus One, is an agglomeration of three private institutes federated with  Dr. A.P.J. Abdul Kalam Technical University in Greater Noida, Uttar Pradesh, India, namely Galgotias Institute of Management and Technology (GIMT), Galgotias College of Engineering and Technology (GCET) and Galgotias College of Pharmacy (GCP). Founded in 1999 by Suneel Galgotia, it offers courses in various subjects up to post-graduation and serves as the corporate headquarters of Galgotias Educational Institutions (GEI).

Campus 

Galgotias Campus One is located adjacent to Knowledge Park II metro station and Pandit Deendayal Upadhyaya Institute of Archaeology in Greater Noida, Uttar Pradesh, India. It has five blocks, a library, playground, two lawns, cafeterias, workshop, boys' and girls' hostels.

Block A (Science Block) 
The Science Block was inaugurated on April 6, 2001 by the-then Union Minister of Agriculture Nitish Kumar. The block is primarily known for handling databases of students registered at AKTU ERP besides serving the accounts and fee section of the campus.

Block B (IT Block) 
The IT Block was inaugurated on April 6, 2001. It serves the Department of Information Technology besides accommodating the Director's Office.

Block C 
Located opposite of Block A and adjacent to Block B, it is popular for its stationery store.

Block D 
Located opposite of Block B, it is popular for hosting the Admission Cell in auditorium as well as the Exam Cell. Block D also hosts eleven laboratories of the Department of Mechanical Engineering and the Department of Civil Engineering.

Block E (CSE BLOCK) 
Situated at the very entrance of the campus, Block E is known for the Reception and the Registrar Office besides accommodating 15 laboratories of mainly computer-related streams.It serves the Department of Computer Science and Engineering.

Affiliations and accreditation 
Established in 1999 as Galgotias Institute of Management and Technology (GIMT), the college is part of Galgotias Educational Institutions and at present offers courses at both undergraduate and postgraduate levels. In 2018, the National Institutional Ranking Framework placed it as leading college in Greater Noida and third in Uttar Pradesh. Prior to December 2021, the college had NBA-accredited programs exclusively available for mechanical engineering and electronics and communication engineering, before getting accreditation in 5 more engineering degrees: computer science and engineering, electrical and electronics engineering, civil engineering, electrical engineering and information technology.

Organization 
Galgotias Campus 1 consists of three institutes under the aegis of Galgotias Educational Institutions (GEI): Galgotias College of Engineering and Technology (GCET), Galgotias Institute of Management and Technology (GIMT) and Galgotias College of Pharmacy (GCP).

Galgotias College of Engineering and Technology (GCET) 
Galgotias College of Engineering and Technology (GCET) is a semi-public federated engineering college affiliated to Dr. A.P.J. Abdul Kalam Technical University, Lucknow and approved by the All India Council for Technical Education, Ministry of Human Resource Development. It is composed of 10 departments:

 Department of Computer Science and Engineering
 Department of Information Technology
 Department of Electronics and Communication Engineering
 Department of Electrical and Electronics Engineering
 Department of Electronics and Instrumentation Engineering
 Department of Mechanical Engineering
 Department of Electrical Engineering
 Department of Civil Engineering
 Department of Applied Science
 Department of Humanities

Galgotias Institute of Management and Technology (GIMT) 
Galgotias Institute of Management and Technology is composed of 2 departments:

 Department of Management Studies
 Department of Computer Applications

Galgotias College of Pharmacy (GCP) 
Galgotias College of Pharmacy is a private pharmacy school affiliated to Dr. A.P.J. Abdul Kalam Technical University (AKTU), Lucknow, approved by the All India Council for Technical Education (AICTE), Ministry of Education, Pharmacy Council of India (PCI) and Uttar Pradesh Board of Technical Education (UPBTE).

 Bachelors in Pharmacy (B. Pharm)
 Diploma in Pharmacy (D. Pharm)

In popular culture 
Numerous Bollywood films have been shot within the premises of Galgotias College. Shaad Ali's Kill Dil (2014), Neeraj Pandey's Aiyaary (2018), M.S. Dhoni: The Untold Story (2016), David Dhawan's Dishoom (2016), and Aanand Rai's Atrangi Re (2021) were all shot on the campus.

References 

Colleges in Uttar Pradesh
2000 establishments in Uttar Pradesh